Lists of record labels in Ghana cover record labels associated with marketing of music recordings and music videos. The list is organized by name, founder and signed artists.

See also 
Music of Ghana

References 

African record labels
Ghana